Richard Jelf may refer to:

 Richard William Jelf (1798–1871), principal of King's College, London
 Richard Henry Jelf (1844–1913), British Army officer